Vietnamese animation or Hoạt hình (Chữ Hán: 活形), Hoạt họa (滑稽), began in 1959 when the Vietnam Animation Studio was formed by a group of young animators (Ngô Mạnh Lân, Lê Minh Hiền, Hồ Quảng, Trương Qua...) who were educated in the historical Soviet Union.

History

1958–1975

The first Vietnamese animation was Đáng đời thằng Cáo (Worthy of the Fox) based on a poem called Con cáo và tổ ong (The fox and the Beehive) produced in 1959, is the first film of the Vietnamese animation industry. It is based on a  poem consisting of 14 lines, telling the story of the fox trying to dig out the beehive to eat honey, but the bees gathered to sting the fox, which scared away the fox. The poem was written at a time when anti-Japanese and anti-West imperialist sentiments were high. 

 Tổ ong lủng lẳng trên cành
 Trong đầy mật nhộng ngon lành lắm thay.
 Cáo già nhè nhẹ lên cây
 Định rằng lấy được, ăn ngay cho giòn.
 Ong thấy Cáo muốn cướp con,
 Kéo nhau xúm lại vây tròn Cáo ta.
 Châm đầu, châm mắt Cáo già
 Cáo già đau quá phải sa xuống rồi.
 Ong kia yêu giống yêu nòi
 Đồng tâm hiệp lực đuổi loài cáo đi.
 Bây giờ ta thử so bì,
 Ong còn đoàn kết, huống chi là người !
 Nhật, Tây áp bức giống nòi,
 Ta nên đoàn kết để đòi tự do.

 English Translation:
 A beehive dangling from a branch
 Filled with delicious nectar.
 The old fox gently climbs the tree
 Determined to get it, eat it right away until it's crispy.
 The bee saw that the fox wanted to rob him,
 Pulling together to surround the fox.
 Stinging the head, stinging the eyes of the old fox
 The old fox was in so much pain that he had to fall down.
 The other bee loves the species
 Teaming up to chase away the foxes.
 Now let's compare,
 Bees are still united, let alone people!
 Japan and West oppress the race,
 We should unite to demand freedom.

1976–1985

1986–2000

2001–2010

2011–present

Vietnamese Animation Studio has been producing 8-10 cartoons a year, most of them are traditionally drawn or by computer and a lot of animations by students groups and small studios. With the rising Vietnamese comics industry in 2010s, Vietnamese animation is hoped to rise, with Asian comics & animation and Western comics & animation to be an initial inspiration for Vietnamese animations and comics to initially draw from. 

Since 2016, animation in Vietnam has seen a significant improvement in 3D animation techniques, thanks to independent animation studios such as Colory Animation or Red Cat Motion. Besides, 2D animation has also had a noticeable change, with the example of DeeDee Animation Studio. Because of the production costs of animation in Vietnam is relatively lower than the global average, Vietnamese animation studios are usually selected as the outsourcing partners for international animation projects. Additionally, using animated videos also becomes a preferred video marketing strategy for several major brands in Vietnam, such as MILO or Lifebuoy.

In late 2018, POPS Worldwide, with the funding from Lifebuoy, publish the animated series "The Silver iOn Squad", produced by DeeDee Animation Studio.

In early 2019, DeeDee Animation Studio also premieres the animated short film "Broken Being: Prequel" on social media channels. The film is positively received by the media and newspapers, such as Dan Tri, Vietnamnet, Tien Phong, etc., who all claim that the film is "the first [21st Century] animated film in Vietnam that targets adults". Meanwhile, according to Dan Tri, "the animated film "Broken Being: Prequel" has changed the animation scene in Vietnam".

From 2021 onwards, Lạc Trôi (Lost & Drifting) is an animation cartoon that has debuted under MTP Entertainment as Son Tung playing the role of a fictional, historical Vietnamese prince who washes ashore into modern society by Episode 9.  ACE Media Viet Nam has been providing the voice-acting and AVR Creative Viet Nam the animation, with a number of other individuals on the project as well.

pops.tv is also home to Vietnamese-made comics and animation.

There has been an ongoing Vietnamese animation series called Thỏ Bảy Màu (Rainbow Bunny). It was first conceived in 2014 by Huỳnh Thái Ngọc. It chronicles the adventures of Rainbow Bunny and its three companions, Sister Xo, her boyfriend Quan, and her grandpa Nam.

Genres
 Painting animation
 Puppet animation
 Clay animation
 Cutout animation
 Paper animation
 Computer animation (2D, 3D...)

Studios

 DeeDee Animation Studio
 Planion Animation
 Omni Animation
 Thunder Cloud Studio
 CG Vietnam
 Studio Biho
 Vietnam Animation Studio
 Hochiminh City Animation Studio
 Liberation Film Studio
 AREKA Studio
 Hongbang University International
 Hanoi Film Productions
 Evertoon Animation Studio
 Sunrise Media
 Animost Animation Studio
 Armada TMT Vietnam
 Biqit Studio
 KimyMedia
 Bamboo Animation
 Colory Animation Studio
 Phamthuynhan Productions
 S18.Animation
 Truong CG Artist
 BIG6 ANIMATION STUDIO
 Rainstorm Film

Animators

 Hà Huy Hoàng
 Phùng Đình Dũng
 Ngô Mạnh Lân
 Lê Minh Hiền
 Hồ Quảng
 Trương Qua
 Cao Thụy
 Mai Long
 Tô Hoài
 Nguyễn Hà Bắc
 Vũ Kim Dũng
 Lê Bình
 Đặng Vũ Thảo
 Phạm Minh Trí
 Nguyễn Thị Phương Hoa
 Phạm Sông Đông
 Nguyễn Thái Hùng
 Trần Thanh Việt
 Phùng Văn Hà
 Huỳnh Vĩnh Sơn
 Nguyễn Cao Hoàng
 Mike Nguyễn
 Bùi Quốc Thắng
 Trần Khánh Duyên
 Doãn Thành
 Đoàn Trần Anh Tuấn
 Châu Võ Bá Trường
 Đoàn Tuấn Anh
 Nguyễn Đắc Hoàng

See also
 Truyện tranh

References

 Hoạt hình Việt Nam : Có lắm người tài ?
 Bước tiến mới cho phim hoạt hình Việt Nam
 Hoạt hình Việt Nam : Thiếu sự phi lý
 Phim hoạt hình 3D Việt Nam : Chập chững đến bao cấp ? (Báo Phụ nữ Việt Nam)
 Phim hoạt hình Việt Nam có tính giáo dục cao : Tìm ở đâu bây giờ ?
 Phim hoạt hình Việt Nam : Bao giờ "bĩ" qua "thái" tới ? - Nhà báo và Công luận // Thứ Bảy, 26 February 2011, 12:30 (AM)

 
1959 establishments in Vietnam
History of animation